Fictional stories sometimes feature a fictional movie or play. In these cases, occasionally, a fictional actor appears. In movies, it is not infrequent that a real, famous actor plays the role of a fictional person who is also an actor.



Fictional actors in movies and television
The following list features fictional actors including, in (parentheses), the real actor who played the fictional actor in a movie. At the end of the entry appears the name of the movie or the television series where the fictional actor appeared.

A, B, C
 A-Train (Jessie T. Usher), real name Reggie Franklin, a member of the Seven, the Vought corporation's most popular superhero team, with the film, television, music, streaming services and promotion deals that entails. Stars as himself in Dawn of the Seven (produced by Vought Studios in association with Vought International), the seventh installment in the Vought Cinematic Universe - The Boys
 Adore (Jackie Haley), androgynous child actor aspirant – The Day of the Locust
 Big Albert (voiced by Roberto Encinas), a monster turned actor, like most stars at MKO; a Frankenstein monster-like being, he is the most intelligent man in the world thanks to his brain; he discovered that MKO producer and former stuntsbeing William A. FitzRandolph had a dangerous secret – Hollywood Monsters 2 (video game)
 Alicia (Cecilia Roth), actress and friend of Hache – Martín (Hache)
 Tim Allgood (Mark Linn-Baker), stagehand and occasional replacing actor ("the burglar") – Noises Off...
 Misa Amane, Japanese model and film actress - Death Note
 Louie Amendola (Jimmy Durante), retired vaudeville actor – The Great Rupert
 Jeffrey Anderson (Kevin Kline), theater and TV actor, acted alongside Celeste Talbert in soap opera The Sun Also Sets (acting as Dr. Rod Randall), former lover of Talbert – Soapdish
 Anna (Sally Kirkland), middle-aged Czech star looking for work in New York – Anna
 The Ape Man (Denny Scott Miller), unidentified actor who impersonates an Ape Man – Gilligan's Island, episode: "The Ape Man"
 Eve Appleton (Kay Francis), actress who rises from burlesque to Broadway – Comet Over Broadway
 Joyce Arden (Bette Davis), temperamental actress, frequent co-star and fiancée of Basil Underwood – It's Love I'm After
 Mavis Arden (Mae West), glamorous movie star, "the talk of the talkies", stranded in rural Pennsylvania while promoting her latest film, Superfine Pictures' Drifting Lady – Go West, Young Man
 Arthur (Stanley Tucci), comedy actor and partner to Maurice – The Impostors
 Don Arturo (Fernando Fernán Gómez), theater actor in the Spanish 1940s and 1950s – El Viaje a Ninguna Parte
 Brooke Ashton (Nicollette Sheridan), theater actress who played Vicki – Noises Off...
 Madeline Ashton (Meryl Streep), narcissistic film and stage actress desperate to retain beauty and fame - Death Becomes Her
 Baby Herman (voiced by Lou Hirsch), toon actor – Who Framed Roger Rabbit
 Hrundi V. Bakshi (Peter Sellers), an extra from India – The Party
 Great Balso (Val Setz) – Powder River
 Josh and Dinah Barkley (Fred Astaire and Ginger Rogers), husband-and-wife musical comedy team who temporarily split up when Dinah is cast in a dramatic play as Sarah Bernhardt – The Barkleys of Broadway
 Tom Baron (Bill Goodwin) – The Jolson Story and Jolson Sings Again
 Diana Barrie (Maggie Smith), Oscar-nominated actress – California Suite
 Tim Bart (Richard Dix), western actor – It Happened in Hollywood
 Bruce Baxter (Kyle Chandler), movie star who acts in films that include sex and nudity – King Kong (2005)
 Sylvia Bennington (Nancy Travis) - Three Men and a Baby and Three Men and a Little Lady
 Bianca (Eline Powell), a young mummer in Izembaro's Braavosi theater troupe - Game of Thrones
 Isabel Bigelow (Nicole Kidman), witch who debuted as an actress with the 2005 remake of Bewitched – Bewitched
 Black Noir, (Nathan Mitchell and Fritzy-Klevans Destine), real name Earving, mysterious mute member of the Seven. Was a member of Payback in the 1980s. Presumably starred as himself in Payback, Red Thunder, three seasons of Payback!, Dawn of the Seven and Noir, Really, a Christmas-themed romantic comedy film - The Boys
 John Blakeford (John Halliday), actor – Hollywood Boulevard
 Belinda Blair (Marilu Henner), theater actress playing Flavia Brent – Noises Off...
 Elliot Blitzer (Bronson Pinchot) an actor, cocaine addict, and police informant in True Romance
 Laney Boggs (Rachael Leigh Cook), 18-year-old student who acts in experimental, performance plays – She's All That
 Don Bolton (Bob Hope) – Caught in the Draft
 Milo Booth (voice unidentified), deceased silent film star whose ghost is impersonated by a dognapper – Scooby-Doo, Where Are You!, episode: "Chiller Diller Movie Thriller"
 Dusty Bottoms (Chevy Chase), acted in westerns with Lucky Day and Ned Nederlander during the silent film era – Three Amigos
 Rodney Bowman (Bruce Lester) – Boy Meets Girl
 Sally Bowles (Liza Minnelli et al.), cabaret actress in Kit Kat Club, Berlin, during the 1930s – Cabaret
 Woody Boyd (Woody Harelson), part-time theatre actor in Cheers
 Billy Boyle (Norman Foster), aging ex-child star and loyal member of director Jake Hannaford's entourage – The Other Side of the Wind (unfinished film)
 Alan Brady (Carl Reiner), star of the Alan Brady Show – The Dick Van Dyke Show, The Alan Brady Show and Mad About You
 Blair Brennan (Paul Johansson), actor in soap opera The Sun Also Sets – Soapdish
 Myles Brent (Edmund Burns), actor – The Death Kiss
 Darryl Brewster (Ron Ely), star of Steve Swaggert, Private Eye; a passenger on The Pacific Princess – The Love Boat
 Dion (Coolio) and Leon Brothers (Chuck D.), directors and probably actors of blaxploitation – An Alan Smithee Film: Burn Hollywood Burn
 Blousey Brown (Florrie Dugger), aspiring actress - Bugsy Malone
 Hecky Brown (Zero Mostel), actor who was blacklisted after he was suspected of being a Communist – The Front
 Thomas Brown (Will Rogers) – Doubting Thomas
 Truman Burbank (Jim Carrey), who acted as himself – The Truman Show
 Russell Burke (Marc Blucas), movie star who shadows Detective Danny Reagan on the job for research on a film role; he ends up assisting Reagan on an actual case – Blue Bloods
 Francis "Frank" Burns (James Russo), troubled movie actor with history of drug addiction – Dangerous Game
 Lola Burns (Jean Harlow), blonde movie sex symbol – Bombshell
 Sir Jeremy Burtom (Alfred Molina), pretentious Shakespearean actor – The Impostors
 Johnny Cage (Dan Pesina and Chris Alexander in video games; Linden Ashby in first movie; Chris Conrad in sequel; Jeff Durbin, Bran Halstead and Ted Nordblum in theatre), action movie star – Mortal Kombat series
 Calvero (Charles Chaplin), washed-up vaudevillian in Limelight; his partner was played by Buster Keaton
 Elsa Campbell (née Brinkmann) (Kim Novak), an unknown hired to portray ill-fated screen legend Lylah Clare in a biopic – The Legend of Lylah Clare
 Wally Campbell (Bob Hope), actor – The Cat and the Canary
 Judy Canfield (Lucille Ball), sharp-tongued, Seattle-born aspiring actress, resident of the theatrical rooming house The Footlights Club – Stage Door
 Carol (Christine Baranski), aging star on Bobby Bowfinger's productions – Bowfinger
 Claudia Casswell (Marilyn Monroe), bubble-headed aspiring actress, "a graduate of the Copacabana School of Dramatic Arts" and protégé of columnist Addison DeWitt – All About Eve
 Tony Cavendish (Fredric March), actor – The Royal Family of Broadway
 Blake Chandler (Sharon Stone), Cybill Shepherd-esque star of Brodsky's film Atlanta – Irreconcilable Differences
 Margo Channing (Bette Davis), temperamental, insecure, veteran Broadway star – All About Eve; Margo Channing was also listed in the opening credits of the film Sleuth (but did not appear in that film) and on a poster briefly seen in the Bette Davis film Connecting Rooms
 Vera Charles (Coral Browne), elegant, alcoholic Broadway star, born in Pittsburgh – Auntie Mame
 Cordelia Chase (Charisma Carpenter), supernatural detective and unsuccessful actress – Angel
 Johnny Drama (né Chase) (Kevin Dillon), Vincent Chase's half-brother, C-list actor, acted in hit TV series Viking Quest, had guest appearances in Melrose Place and Nash Bridges; also Vincent's cook and fitness consultant – Entourage
 Victoria Chase (Wendy Malick), actress from Edge of Tomorrow, a soap opera that was canceled after a very long run; recently won an Oscar for Best Supporting Actress – Hot In Cleveland
 Vincent "Vince" Chase (Adrian Grenier), up-and-coming Hollywood movie actor from Queens; had a breakout with Head On, co-starring Jessica Alba; turned out big budget studio film Matterhorn to work on indie Queens Boulevard, well received in Sundanc; played title character in James Cameron's Aquaman – Entourage
 Thelma Cheri (Marla Shelton), double-crossing Hollywood star – Stand-In
 Cherish (Alicia Witt), redhead porn actress who "parodies" Honey Whitlock's movies – Cecil B. DeMented
 Cherry Chester (Margaret Sullavan), née Sarah Brown, temperamental movies star/heiress – The Moon's Our Home
 Alpa Chino (Brandon T. Jackson), rapper/actor – Tropic Thunder
 Christian (Ewan McGregor), bohemian poet and forced actor in his own play in 1899 in the Moulin Rouge – Moulin Rouge!
 Lorne Chumley, legendary motion picture actor; his extraordinary makeup skills earned him the nickname "The Man With a Million Faces" (parody of Lon Chaney Sr.) – The New Scooby-Doo Movies
 Jake Clampett (King Donovan), penniless struggling actor arrested for theft – The Beverly Hillbillies, episode: "The Clampetts Are Overdrawn"
 Lylah Clare (Kim Novak), ill-fated screen legend (inspired by Greta Garbo and Marlene Dietrich), being portrayed by Elsa Campbell (née Brinkmann) in biopic – The Legend of Lylah Clare
 John Clarron (Derek Farr), retired actor plotting to poison his wife - The Saint season 1 episode 1 "The Talented Husband"
 Laura Claybourne (Emma Samms), soap opera actress – Delirious
 Daisy Clover (Natalie Wood), teenage singer/actress of the 1930s (inspired by Judy Garland and Deanna Durbin), briefly married to bisexual actor Wade Lewis – Inside Daisy Clover
 Katherine “Kitty” Cobham (Cherie Lunghi), posing as the Duchess of Wharfedale - The Duchess and the Devil
 Jack Cole (Thomas Haden Church), a past-his-prime actor looking for one last hookup before his impending marriage and real estate career - Sideways
 Willie Coon (George Forbes), TV actor acting in racist series That's My Boy – C.S.A.: The Confederate States of America
 Chad Dylan Cooper (Sterling Knight), teen soap star diva on fictional TV series, "Mackenzie Falls", TV series Sonny with a Chance
 Jonathan Cooper (Richard Todd), actor wanted for murder – Stage Fright
 Professor Arthur Corvus (Mark Pellegrino) - (A Murder of Crows)
 Lori Craven (Elisabeth Shue), actress in soap opera The Sun Also Sets, related to star Celeste Talbert (character: Angelique) – Soapdish
 Crimson Countess (Laurie Holden), was a member of Vought's superhero team Payback in the 1980,. starring as herself in their origin film Payback as well as cult classic Red Thunder and superhero crime thriller Whiskey Sunrise. In present day she continues to work for Vought, performing at a Voughtland amusement park - The Boys
 Richard Crosby (Gary Oldman), three-time Academy Award nominee, acted in a war movie with Joey Tribbiani – Friends
 Nina Cruz (Candela Peña), theater actress along with Huma Rojo in A Streetcar Named Desire – All About My Mother

D, E, F
 Daisy (Heather Graham), aspiring actress cast in Bobby Bowfinger's new movie - Bowfinger
 Mary Louise Dahl, aka Baby Doll (voiced by Alison LaPlaca in Batman: The Animated Series, and Laraine Newman in The New Batman Adventures), actress who starred in sitcom That's Our Baby – Batman: The Animated Series and The New Batman Adventures
 Oscar "John" Dale (Bob Random), androgynous-looking actor who failed to suicide when director Jake Hannaford saved him, then became leading man of Hannaford's last film – The Other Side of the Wind (unfinished film)
 Frederick Dallas (Christopher Reeve), tall and handsome theater actor who played Philip Brent – Noises Off...
 Rick Dalton (Leonardo DiCaprio), 1960's actor whose roles include Jake Cahill in Bounty Law and Caleb Decoteau in Lancer in the film Once Upon a Time in Hollywood and novel.
 Alexander Dane (Alan Rickman), Shakespearean actor who played the role of alien Dr. Lazarus in the fictional television series Galaxy Quest – Galaxy Quest
 Carlton Dane (Otto Kruger), retired stage actor – Lights Out, episode "Curtain Call"
 Dante (Eusebio Poncela), homosexual actor and uncle of Hache – Martín (Hache)
 Ann Darrow (Fay Wray, remake Naomi Watts) – King Kong (1933) and King Kong (2005)
 Rachel Davenport (Christina Milan), actress in Warrior Angel, a superhero-themed motion picture – Smallville
 Julian Davis (Henry Daniell), actor – Dressed to Kill (1941)
 Broken Nose Dawson/Spencer Dutro (Brian Donlevy), actor – Another Face
 Jack Dawson (Grant Show), famous action film star – Dirt
 Lucky Day (Steve Martin), acted in westerns with Dusty Bottoms and Ned Nederlander during the silent film era – Three Amigos
 Peggy Dayton (Janis Paige), wet-inside-the-ears swimming star cast as Empress Josephine in a musical film version of War and Peace called Not Tonight – Silk Stockings
 Viola De Lesseps (Gwyneth Paltrow), theater actress in the 1500s – Shakespeare in Love
 The Deep (Chace Crawford), real name Kevin Moskowitz, a member of the Seven. Stars as himself in Rising Tide (released by Vought Studios) and in Not Without My Dolphin based on his bestselling autobiography, Deeper. He also appears in Dawn of the Seven: The Fun Cut - The Boys
 Alexandra Del Lago (Geraldine Page), faded movie star trying to make a comeback – Sweet Bird of Youth
 Gwen DeMarco (Sigourney Weaver), actor who played the role of Lieutenant Tawny Madison in the fictional television series Galaxy Quest – Galaxy Quest
 Herb Denning (Dick Miller), secondary actor on Lawrence Woolsey's movies – Matinee
 Norma Desmond (Gloria Swanson, future remake Glenn Close), star of silent movies – Sunset Boulevard
 Sophie Devereaux (Gina Bellman, an accomplished grifter with a taste for art theft who also attempts to become a legitimate actress - Leverage
 Kitty Devine (Sharon Farrell), 1960s film actress – The Beverly Hillbillies, episode: "The Movie Starlet"
 Sara Devine (Diana Sands), flamboyant aspiring actress, cousin of nurse Julia Baker – Julia
 Rose DeWitt Bukater (Kate Winslet), motion picture actress living in Santa Monica, California, in the 1920s – Titanic
 Larry Dixon (Fred Scott) – The Last Outlaw (1936)
 Maxwell Donahue (Conrad Janis), lead actor from Atomic Man, a 1960s superhero-themed television series – Remington Steele
 Mia Dolan (Emma Stone), struggling actress – La La Land
 Michael Dorsey (Dustin Hoffman), failed male actor and successful TV actress as Dorothy Michaels – Tootsie
 Carl Dougherty (no voice actor), one of the greatest monster-stars at MKO; looks like an alien; Dan Murray believes him to look like Bobby Russell, masseur of the Freaks sport team – Hollywood Monsters 2 (video game)
 Cameron Drake (Matt Dillon), Oscar winner for his portrayal of a homosexual soldier – In & Out
 Damian Drake (Timothy Dalton), super-spy who also stars in movies acting as a super-spy – Looney Tunes: Back in Action
 Oliver Duffy (Lew Ayres), actor – Fingers at the Window
 Phil Duncan (Richard Vanstone), inspired in Humphrey Bogart, star of John Wilson's The African Trader – White Hunter Black Heart
 David Earle (Charles Trowbridge), actor – Dressed to Kill (1941)
 Aaron Echolls (Harry Hamlin), famous movie star living in Neptune, California - Veronica Mars
 Lynn Echolls (née Lester) (Lisa Rinna), a famous movie star, wife of Aaron Echolls - Veronica Mars
 Frank Elgin (Bing Crosby), alcoholic, has-been singer/actor who is given one last chance to star in a musical – The Country Girl
 Margaret Elliot (Bette Davis), bankrupt, Oscar-winning star desperate to make a comeback – The Star
 Betty Elms (Naomi Watts), young and aspiring actress from Deep River, Ontario; lookalike of Diane Selwyn – Mulholland Drive
 Ruby Engels (Camila Ashland), a long retired actress spying for the Resistance - V and V: The Final Battle
 Mary Evans (Constance Bennett), waitress who achieves screen fame as "America's Pal" – What Price Hollywood?
 Eve (Eve Arden), extremely catty, cat-loving, aspiring actress, resident of the theatrical rooming house The Footlights Club – Stage Door
 Mr. Fabian (Billy Zane), stage actor - Tombstone
 Zallia Z. Fairchild, Silent screen actor who tried to scare away production of Sandy Duncan movie so as not to destroy his film studio/home – The New Scooby-Doo Movies (Loosely based on Francis X. Bushman)
 Faith Fairlane (Kelly Ripa), TV soap star diva fired for burning down her set - Hope and Faith
 Frankie Fane (Stephen Boyd), obnoxious, Oscar-nominated actor – The Oscar
 David Farley (Dennis Cole), star of Jungle Man, action/adventure television series which featured the exploits of a Tarzan-like character – Fantasy Island
 Jennifer Farrell (Ann Jillian), deceased movie actress whose ghost haunts her former mansion, TV series Jennifer Slept Here
 Ty Farrell (Daniel Riordan), an egotistical actor mistaken for his space hero character and brought to an alien planet - The Adventures of Captain Zoom in Outer Space
 Tom Farrell (James Dreyfus) – Gimme Gimme Gimme
 Lloyd Fellowes (Michael Caine), theater director and occasional replacing actor due to the behind-the-scenes action – Noises Off...
 Joey Ferrini (Dayton Callie), former professional thug who played an on-screen thug in several occasions; hired by an undercover alien to send a message to another one – Roswell
 Gladys Flatt (Joi Lansing), fictional actress wife of musician/songwriter Lester Flatt – The Beverly Hillbillies, Episode "Delovely and Scruggs"
 Guy Fleegman (Sam Rockwell), actor who played "Crewman #6" in an episode of the fictional television series Galaxy Quest – Galaxy Quest
 Karen Flores (Rene Russo), B-movie actress under Harry Zimm, later worked with Chili Palmer – Get Shorty
 Ward Fowler (William Shatner), actor who played Lucerne, a TV detective, on an episode of Columbo
 Billie Frank (Sherilyn Fenn), alcoholic has-been ex-soap actress who struggles with her self-destructive habits – Rude Awakening
 Trudi Frazer (Julia Butters) child actor playing Mirabella Lancer on Lancer in the 2019 film Once Upon a Time in Hollywood and 2021 novel of the same name.
 Francis Fryer (Dick Wesson), stage actor – Calamity Jane (1953)
 Al Fuller (Al Jolson), actor – Mammy (1930)
 Dr. Tobias Fünke (David Cross), from FOX's Arrested Development, was the chief resident of psychiatry at Mass General before he lost his medical license after administering CPR to a person who did not need it; now pursuing his acting career and is most known for his roles as Frightened Inmate #2 and his portrayal of his father-in-law George Bluth Sr. on an episode of the television series Scandalmakers – Arrested Development

G, H, I
 Carlos Galván (José Sacristán), theater actor in the Spanish 1940s and 1950s; son of Don Arturo – El Viaje a Ninguna Parte
 Don Arturo Galván (Fernando Fernán Gómez), theater actor in the Spanish 1940s and head of a family of actors – El Viaje a Ninguna Parte
 Elliott Garfield (Richard Dreyfuss) – The Goodbye Girl
 Lily Garland (Carole Lombard), née Mildred Plotka, extremely temperamental stage actress, protégé of egomaniacal Broadway producer Oscar Jaffe – Twentieth Century
 Lucienne Garnier (Louise Brooks), French beauty contest winner chosen to star in a film, La chanteuse éperdue – Prix de Beauté
 Jason Gibbons (Matt Leblanc), Hollywood action movie star dating Alex Munday - Charlie's Angels (2000) and Charlie's Angels: Full Throttle
 Kay Gibson (Marisa Berenson), inspired by Katharine Hepburn, star of John Wilson's The African Trader – White Hunter Black Heart
 Eve Gill (Jane Wyman), aspiring actress studying at RADA – Stage Fright
 Hannah Gill (Laura Linney), acted as Meryl Burbank – The Truman Show
 Joey Gladstone, stand-up comedian and actor - Full House
 Joel Glicker (David Krumholtz), child who acted as Indian chief in a Thanksgiving Day play at the summer camp – Addams Family Values
 Steve Gogarty (Jack Oakie), vaudeville actor – That's the Spirit
 Rex Goodbody (John Dehner), TV soap star whose character dies on the operating table – The Beverly Hillbillies, episode: "The Soap Star"
 Walter Graham (Ron Halder), immortal impresario and unsuccessful actor who sought out pre-immortal protégés and killed them at the "perfect" moment to ensure a long career – Highlander
 Gary Granite (voice of Bob Hopkins), star of horror film The Monster from the Tar Pits – The Flintstones
 Ginger Grant (Tina Louise), beautiful red-haired movie star stranded on a desert island – Gilligan's Island
 Robert Graubel (Lawrence Grant) – To Hell with the Kaiser!
 "Great Britain" aka Cyborg 007 - Cyborg 009
 Sylvester the Great (Bob Hope) – The Princess and the Pirate
 Faye Greener (Karen Black), undistinguished dress extra of late 1930s pictures – The Day of the Locust
 Evan Greer (Jason Lewis), plays Dr. Brock Sterling in a soap opera watched by Dr. Gregory House – House, M.D.
 Sharon Groan (muppet, unknown performer), parody of Sharon Stone, starred in Basically It Stinks – The Adventures of Elmo in Grouchland
 Gunpowder (Sean Patrick Flanery, Gattlin Griffith and Joel Gagne), was a member of Payback in the 1980s, starring as himself in Payback, Red Thunder and Payback! - The Boys
 Matt Hagen (Ron Perlman), an actor and supervillain under the alias of Clayface – Batman: The Animated Series
 Stephanie "Steffi" Hajos (Mona Barrie), glamorous, foreign-born Hollywood star – Something to Sing About
 Harold Hall (Harold Lloyd), actor – Movie Crazy
 Kaye Hamilton (Andrea Leeds), unemployed, hysterical, suicidal young actress, resident of the theatrical rooming house The Footlights Club – Stage Door
 Rollin Hand (Martin Landau), "The Man of a Million Faces", IMF agent, actor and expert at disguises, quick-change artistry, sleight of hand and pickpocketing - Mission: Impossible
 Harry Hankle (Mark Hadlow), old, failed vaudeville actor who played in Chicago – King Kong (2005)
 Richard Hardell (Fredric March), actor – The Studio Murder Mystery
 Jim Hardy (Bing Crosby), singer from a Broadway trio who retire to live on a Connecticut ranch – Holiday Inn
 Buddy Hare (Keenan Wynn), cornball vaudevillian and bottom-feeding radio actor – The Hucksters
 Eve Harrington (Anne Baxter), up-and-coming Broadway star and fan of Margo Channing – All About Eve
 Bob Harris (Bill Murray), aging movie star filming a whisky ad in Tokyo; his marriage suffers for his midlife crisis – Lost in Translation
 Nico Harris (Brandon Smith), teenage African American comedian on fictional series So Random, TV series Sonny with a Chance
 Gwen Harrison (Catherine Zeta-Jones), usually paired with Eddie Thomas – America's Sweethearts
 Kyle Hart (Patrick Lowe), star of Moments to Live, a soap opera; Dr. Sam Beckett leaped into his body to rescue him from a deranged fan – Quantum Leap
 Tawni Hart (Tiffany Thornton), vain blonde comedian on fictional series So Random, TV series Sonny with a Chance
 Harriet Hayes (Sarah Paulson), cast member of the same-named show-within-the-show – Studio 60 on the Sunset Strip
 Joyce Heath (Bette Davis), "jinxed" alcoholic actress – Dangerous
 Jackson Hedley (Sir Derek Jacobi CBE), the worst Shakespearian actor in the world – Frasier
 John Henry (Joseph Runningfox), Native American student who acted as Romeo in Shakespeare's play at school, even after racist threats – Porky's
 Daniel Hillard (Robin Williams), professional actor who played Mrs. Doubtfire in real life and then on television – Mrs. Doubtfire
 Amy Hobbs (Alanna Ubach), soap opera actress – See Dad Run
 David Hobbs (Scott Baio), former TV actor, now stay-at-home dad – See Dad Run
 Jack Holden (Ted Danson) - Three Men and a Baby and Three Men and a Little Lady
 Homelander (Antony Starr), real name John, the extremely powerful leader of the Seven. Stars as himself in Dawn of the Seven as well as Homelander: Brightest Night, an eighteen-part Vought+ original miniseries chronicling his life as a superhero - The Boys
 Uncle Horst/Henri (Jason Alexander), actor and con artist – Madeline: Lost in Paris
 Jilli Hopper (Téa Leoni), TV actress with a "bad girl" reputation, was murdered – People I Know
 BoJack Horseman (Will Arnett), has-been sitcom actor – BoJack Horseman
 Baby Jane Hudson (Bette Davis), child vaudeville actress in the 1910s; failure of movie actress in the 1930s – What Ever Happened to Baby Jane?
 Blanche Hudson (Joan Crawford), sister of Baby Jane Hudson, movie star in the 1930s until a car accident left her in wheelchair and retired – What Ever Happened to Baby Jane?
 Andy Ingham (Gene Wilder), radio actor in comedic horror series – Haunted Honeymoon
 Charlotte Inwood (Marlene Dietrich), flamboyant stage actress/singer suspected of murdering her husband – Stage Fright

J, K, L
 B. Jackson, stars in Tit for Tat – Noir
 Maggie Jacobs, Scottish bit-part extra, best friend of Andy Millman – Extras
 Annie January, aka the superhero Starlight (Erin Moriarty and Maya Misaljevic), recently made member of the Seven. Stars as herself in Dawn of the Seven  - The Boys
 Rudi Janus (Luther Adler), actor – The Magic Face
 Jem (Britta Phillips), pink-haired actress/entertainer alter ego of music producer Jerica Benton – Jem and the Holograms
 Sarah Jennings (Madonna), movie actress having an affair with the director of her latest film – Dangerous Game
 Tom Jeter (Nate Corddry), cast member of the same-named show-within-the-show – Studio 60 on the Sunset Strip
 Anthony John (Ronald Colman), psychotic actor whose personal life takes on the characters that he is portraying – A Double Life
 Gary Johnston (voiced by Trey Parker), Broadway actor recruited to go undercover as an Arab terrorist - Team America: World Police
 Tracy Jordan (Tracy Morgan), TGS with Tracy Jordan, Who Dat Ninja?, Black Cop/White Cop, and Honky Grandma be Trippin – 30 Rock
 Vance Michael Justin (no actor, only image on poster), idol of teenagers; star of fantasy movie where fans go in cosplay to the premiere; Cornelia Hare is infatuated with him – W.I.T.C.H.
 Gypsy King  (Wally Patch) – Don Quixote
 Stan "King" Kaiser (Joseph Bologna), star of live television comedy-variety show c.1954 (loosely based on Sid Caesar) – My Favorite Year
 Anna Kalman (Ingrid Bergman), actress on the London stage – Indiscreet
 Anton Karidian (Arnold Moss), Shakespearean actor from the episode "The Conscience of the King" – Star Trek: The Original Series
 Karla (Melina Mercouri), lesbian screen legend – Jacqueline Susann's Once Is Not Enough
 Tony Kelly (George Barrows), Hollywood actor hired to play a gorilla, – The Beverly Hillbillies, episode: "The Gorilla"
 "Wyoming Bill" Kelso (Denny Miller), cowboy movie star – The Party
 Sahir Khan (Shahrukh Khan), Bollywood actor, fictional version of himself — Billu
 Cole Kim (Sung Kang), aspiring actor who auditions as a body double for the late Bruce Lee in his uncompleted film, Game of Death – Finishing the Game
 Tad Kimura (Frank Michael Liu), martial arts film star; mysteriously collapsed and died on a movie set – Quincy, M.E.
 Mima Kirigoe (voiced by Junko Iwao and Ruby Marlowe) leaves her J-pop idol group to become a full-time actress - Perfect Blue
 Kira Klay (Shannyn Sossamon), fictional actress in Dirt who died in the first episode of the series – Dirt
 Daphne Kluger (Anne Hathaway), famous Hollywood movie star - Ocean's Eight
 Edgar Kojdanovski (voiced by Fran Jiménez), a weird-looking hopeful monster who wanted to start his career playing an alien for MKO; he worked as an usher waiting for his big chance; Dan Murray cannot remember his first name – Hollywood Monsters 2 (video game)
 Cosmo Kramer (Michael Richards), neighbor of Jerry Seinfeld - Seinfeld
 Krusty the Clown (voiced by Dan Castellaneta), Herschel Shmoikel Pinchas Yerucham Krustofsky - The Simpsons
 Fred Kwan (Tony Shalhoub), actor who played the role of Tech Sergeant Chen in the fictional television series Galaxy Quest – Galaxy Quest
 Selina Kyle, lead actress and owner of the Monarch Theatre in Gotham City - Batman: Gotham by Gaslight
 Lady Crane (Essie Davis), a mummer in Izembaro's Braavosi theater troupe - Game of Thrones
 Alex Lambert (Teri Polo), movie actress dating a high school science teacher, TV series I'm with Her
 Julia Lambert (Annette Bening), successful actress with bad taste in men – Being Julia
 Lina Lamont (Jean Hagen), "shimmering, glowing star" of silent movies – Singin' in the Rain
 Lamplighter (Shawn Ashmore), a retired member of the Seven - The Boys
 Zora Lancaster (Allisyn Ashley Arm), eccentric wild-eyed comedian on So Random – Sonny with a Chance
 Nick Lang (Michael J. Fox), action film star – The Hard Way
 Cary Launer (Ryan O'Neal), Oscar-awarded corrupt movie star; his public rep is Eli Wurman – People I Know
 Lauren (Natascha McElhone), who acted as Sylvia – The Truman Show
 Helen Lawson (Susan Hayward), tough, temperamental Broadway singer/actress – Valley of the Dolls
 Kirk Lazarus (Robert Downey Jr.), the dude playing the dude disguised as another dude! - Tropic Thunder
 Buford Lee (James Lew), martial arts star – 18 Fingers of Death!
 Lucas Lee (Chris Evans), a pro skateboarder turned action movie star with super-strength; Ramona Flowers's second evil ex-boyfriend and a rival to Scott Pilgrim – Scott Pilgrim vs. the World
 Gary Lejeune (John Ritter), theater actor who plays Roger Tramplemain – Noises Off...
 Gregory LeMaise (Carleton G. Young), actor – Abbott and Costello in Hollywood
 Lilly Leonard (Bette Midler), a famous Hollywood actress tangling with a paparazzo, her daughter's marriage, her own marriage, her ex-husband and his marriage - That Old Feeling
 Sandy Lester (Teri Garr), actress, lover of Michael Dorsey, lost a role to Dorothy Michaels, finally appears with Michael Dorsey in Jeff Slater's Return to Love Canal – Tootsie
 Vicki Lester (Janet Gaynor in A Star Is Born (1937), Judy Garland in A Star Is Born (1954)), real name Esther Victoria Blodgett, protégée of aging star Norman Maine
 Wade Lewis (Robert Redford), bisexual matinée idol of the 1930s, briefly married to teenage singer/actress Daisy Clover – Inside Daisy Clover
 Brynn Lilly (Amber Valletta), aspirant actress and wife of prolific TV writer David Lilly – Man About Town
 Tracy Lime (Kirsten Dunst), teenage actress who acted as Albanian girl during fake war propaganda – Wag the Dog
 Gordon Ling (Otto Kruger), stage actor – Black Widow
 Edward Lionheart (Vincent Price), Shakespearian actor – Theatre of Blood
 Sir Frederick Littlefield (Mark Robbins), an English Shakespearean actor who appeared in the (fictional) biopic The Jefferson Davis Story as a black slave – C.S.A.: The Confederate States of America
 Don Lockwood (Gene Kelly), the greatest actor ever – Singin' in the Rain
 Garfield "Gar" Mark Logan, shapeshifter superhero Beast Boy (voiced by Logan Grove, Jason Spisak and Greg Cipes), plays alien shapeshifter Lieutenant Tork on Space Trek 3016 - Young Justice
 Breeze Loo (Roger Fan), self-absorbed star of Bruceploitation films – Finishing the Game
 Rinaldo Lopez (Mischa Auer), actor – Pick a Star
 Georgia Lorrison (Lana Turner), alcoholic movie star, daughter of Shakespearean actor George Lorrison – The Bad and the Beautiful
 Eva Lovelace (Katharine Hepburn), née Ada Love, Vermont-born aspiring actress – Morning Glory
 Rebecca Lowell (Tamara Gorski), actress who feared aging and attempted to trick the vampire Angel into turning her in the episode Eternity
 Lyle (Adrian Grenier), star of DeMented's movies – Cecil B. DeMented
 Sarah Lynn (Kristen Schaal), former child sitcom actress turned pop singer – BoJack Horseman

M, N, O
 Richard Mace (Michael Robbins), a strolling thespian and occasional highwayman in 1666, in the Doctor Who serial The Visitation
 Maureen MacKenzie (unseen character), movie star who turned down the Carl Denham's role after hearing about Skull Island; the role eventually went to Ann Darrow – King Kong (2005)
 Chris MacNeil (Ellen Burstyn), famous actress and mother of a possessed child – The Exorcist
 Elizabeth "Liza" Madden (Marlene Dietrich), bold, eccentric Broadway musical comedy star who finds an abandoned baby – The Lady is Willing
 Maggie (Shannyn Sossamon), actress girlfriend of Miles Dumont - The Holiday
 Norman Maine (Fredric March) in A Star Is Born (1937) and James Mason in the remake A Star Is Born (1954)
 Jean Maitland (Ginger Rogers), sarcastic young actress/chorus girl/dancer, resident of the theatrical rooming house The Footlights Club, sometime mistress of producer Anthony Powell – Stage Door
 Julia Mallory (Laura Allen), fictional film and TV actress – Dirt
 Ariel Maloney (Teri Hatcher), plays Dr. Monica Demonico in soap opera The Sun Also Sets – Soapdish
 Irene Malvern (Ginger Rogers), glamorous but lonely and world-weary film actress – Week-End at the Waldorf
 Doris Mann (Shirley MacLaine), veteran star – Postcards from the Edge
 Olga Mara (Judy Landon), exotic silent screen vamp who finds talking pictures "vulgar" – Singin' in the Rain
 Anthony Marchaund (Joseph Schildkraut), alcoholic ex-actor – The Cheaters
 Josephine Marcus (Dana Delany), stage actress that catches the eye of Wyatt Earp - Tombstone
 Ann Marie (Marlo Thomas), aspiring (but only sporadically employed) actress, living in New York City – That Girl
 Christine Marlowe (Lucille Ball), theater actress in Leo Davis' Hail and Farewell – Marx Brothers' film Room Service and the play on which it is based
 Rita Marlowe (Jayne Mansfield), the famous actress with the oh-so-kissable lips (suggested by Marilyn Monroe) – Will Success Spoil Rock Hunter?
 Jenna Maroney (Jane Krakowski) – TGS with Tracy Jordan, The Rural Juror, Law & Order: Special Victims Unit – 30 Rock
 Sarah Marshall (Kristen Bell), TV star vainly trying to "jump to the big screen", was in a relationship with her series' musician – Forgetting Sarah Marshall
Antonio Martinez (Owen Nares) – The Private Life of Don Juan
 Mary (Mary Kornman), Little Rascals character, silent film child actress in Should Husbands Work? – Our Gang, short: Dogs of War
 Philippe Martin (Francis Lederer) – One Rainy Afternoon
 Steve Martin (William Demarest) – The Jolson Story and Jolson Sings Again
 Stone Mason – star of White Wagon Mastery and Tarzan: Lord of the Nigs as well as multiple slave training films – C.S.A.: The Confederate States of America
 Maurice (Oliver Platt), comedy actor and partner to Arthur – The Impostors
 Jean Louise McArthur (Veronica Hart), a fictional porn star going by "Viveca St. John" in an episode of Six Feet Under; starred in movies including Deep Diving and Easy Slider – Six Feet Under
 Troy McClure (voice of Phil Hartman), B-movie actor and infomercial pitchman – The Simpsons
 The Great McGonigle (W.C. Fields), theatre actor – The Old Fashioned Way 
 Rance McGrew (Larry Blyden), TV western star – The Twilight Zone season 3 episode "Showdown With Rance McGrew"
 Charlie McKay (Breckin Meyer), brother of Kate McKay, befriends Leopold after assuming him a fellow character actor - Kate & Leopold
 Elise McKenna (Jane Seymour), early 20th-century stage actress with a time-traveling boyfriend – Somewhere in Time
 Holt McLaren (Josh Stewart), fictional film actor – Dirt
 Jessica Medlicott (Katharine Hepburn), aging grand dame of the London theater, accused by a young man of seducing and then abandoning him – Love Among the Ruins
 Lora Meredith (Lana Turner), glamorous stage and screen actress with complicated private life – Imitation of Life
 Angela Merrova (Lya Lys), actress who was supposedly murdered, but mysteriously turns up alive and well the next day – The Return of Doctor X
 Melvyn Merry (George Raistrick), parody of Moore Marriott and a sidekick to Will Silly in the fictional film Oh, Mr. Bankrobber! – Norbert Smith – a Life
 Mesmer (Haley Joel Osment), real name Charles. As a mindreading Supe child actor, he played the lead (a fictionalized version of himself) in The Mesmerizer (produced by Vought Studios in association with Vought International) - The Boys
 Dorothy Michaels (Dustin Hoffman), TV star actress and secretly an actor – Tootsie
 Mickey Michaelson (Chuck McCann), actor who played Captain Bellybuster, a mascot for Hamburger Heaven, a fast food restaurant – The Greatest American Hero
 Mikayla (Selena Gomez), recurring actress/entertainer rival of Hannah – Hannah Montana
 Danny Miller (Larry Parks), actor – Down to Earth
 Peppy Miller (Bérénice Bejo), perky young extra who became a movie star after being discovered by actor George Valentin – The Artist
 Andy Millman (Ricky Gervais), perennial extra and eventual sitcom star – Extras
 Grady Mitchell (Doug Brochu), heavy-set blonde comedian on So Random – Sonny with a Chance
 Larry Mitchell (Robert Montgomery), actor – Free and Easy
 Mindstorm (Ryan Blakely), a member of Payback in the 1980s, starred as himself in Payback, Payback! and, after the team disbanded, his own live stage show called Mental Magic with Mindstorm at the Planet Vought Casino & Resort in Las Vegas - The Boys
 Miriam (Lesley-Anne Down), stage actress and member of the train robbery crew - The First Great Train Robbery
 Hannah Montana (Miley Cyrus), née Miley Stewart, actress/entertainer on Disney TV Series Hannah Montana
 Lee Montgomery (Mary Elizabeth Winstead) young actress playing a cheerleader on a day off in Death Proof
 Montana Moorehead (Cathy Moriarty), transsexual actor (real name Milton Moorehead) who acted as Nurse Nan in soap opera The Sun Also Sets alongside rival Celeste Talbert – Soapdish
 Edward "Pee Wee" Morris (Dan Monahan), student who acted as a fairy in Shakespeare's play at school – Porky's
 Eva Morte (voiced by Roberto Encinas), a female monster actor working for MKO; she dislikes the idea of making family movies instead of horror movies – Hollywood Monsters 2 (video game)
 Selsdon Mowbray (Denholm Elliott), theater actor playing "the burglar" – Noises Off...
 Sonny Munroe (Demi Lovato), teenage TV comedian turned singer – Sonny With a Chance
 Ned Nederlander (Martin Short), acted in westerns with Dusty Bottoms and Lucky Day during the silent film era – Three Amigos
 Maggie Nelson (voiced by Anna Paquin), an aspiring young actress who accidentally gains chameleon-like abilities - Stan Lee Presents: Mosaic
 Jason Nesmith (Tim Allen), actor who played the role of Commander Peter Quincy Taggart in the fictional television series Galaxy Quest – Galaxy Quest
 Julie Nichols (Jessica Lange), soap opera star and co-star of Dorothy Michaels – Tootsie
 Steve Nichols (John Ritter), struggling actor who stops a robbery dressed in a superhero costume – Hero at Large
 Jennifer North (Sharon Tate), beautiful but untalented star of French "art films" (in reality soft-core pornography)  – Valley of the Dolls
 Neely O'Hara (Patty Duke), neurotic, pill-popping singer/actress – Valley of the Dolls
 Anthony O'Malley (Michael Caine), a veteran (and possibly gay, according to Thomas Quirk) actor – The Actors (2003)
 John O'Malley (John Cullum), alcoholic stage actor who played the lead role of Don Quixote in Man of La Mancha – Quantum Leap
 Patty O'Neill (Maggie McNamara), virginal singer/actress in Chloro-Foam Beer commercials – The Moon Is Blue
 Byron Orlock (Boris Karloff), veteran horror-film star – Targets
 Kathy O'Rourke (Patty McCormack), bratty child star – Kathy O'
 Dotty Otley (Carol Burnett), theater actress playing Mrs. Clackett – Noises Off...
 Otto-parody of Erich von Stroheim role of Maximillian von Mayerling; Otto played the butler to Lorme Chumley, legendary motion picture actor aka "The Man With a Million Faces" (parody of Lon Chaney Sr.) – The New Scooby-Doo Movies
 Knox Overstreet (Josh Charles), student and member of the Dead Poets Society, who acted in a play even after threats – Dead Poets Society

P, Q, R
 Beatrice Page (Ginger Rogers), beautiful, glamorous, but aging Broadway star who cannot accept that she is too old to play ingénues – Forever Female
 Valerie Page (Natasha Wightman), lesbian actress who starred in The Salt Flats – V for Vendetta
 Linda Paige (Rosalind Russell), glamorous Broadway comedian, wife of playwright Gaylord Esterbrook, who writes parts for her – No Time for Comedy
 Reginald Parker (John Loder), actor – The Brighton Strangler
 Vic Patterson (Eric Allen Kramer), star of The Eagle, a television crime drama – CSI: Crime Scene Investigation
 Mr. Peanutbutter (Paul F. Tompkins), former sitcom actor turned reality TV star – BoJack Horseman
 Vickie Pearle (Gilda Radner), radio actress in comedic horror series – Haunted Honeymoon
 Penny  (Kaley Cuoco), struggling actress living in a Pasadena apartment – The Big Bang Theory
 Neil Perry (Robert Sean Leonard), student and member of the Dead Poets Society, who acts in a play even against his father's wishes, only to commit suicide afterwards – Dead Poets Society
 Peter, el Hombre Inmaterial ("Peter the Inmaterial Man", voiced by Eduardo del Hoyo), an invisible monster actor working for MKO, one of the most intelligent people in the world and a close friend to Big Albert – Hollywood Monsters 2 (video game)
 Deanna Petrie (Yvonne Sciò), star of musical comedies in the 1940s; disappeared mysteriously in a haunted house – Rose Red
 Robert Pierce Mitchell (Rick Wells), television action star who played Johnny Dynamo from 1982 through 1984 – Johnny Dynamo
 Talbot Pierce (George Douglas) – The Night Riders
 Carlos Piñeiro (Gabino Diego), theater actor in the Spanish 1940s and 1950s; long lost son of Carlos Galván – El Viaje a Ninguna Parte
 Lester Plum (Joan Blondell), former child star reduced to being a stand-in at Colossal Studios – Stand-In
 Abe Polin (Alan King), "King of the Extras" in Memories of Me
 Troy Poon (Dustin Nguyen), once a rising television star, now unemployed and working for work – Finishing the Game
 Popclaw (Brittany Allen), real name Charlotte, a Supe whose hero career was ruined by the paparazzi, leading to her working in D-List movies - The Boys
 Jeff Portnoy (Jack Black), drug-addicted comedian-actor - Tropic Thunder
 Claire Poulet (Melora Hardin), née Carolyn Crosson, struggling actress who died in elevator crash – Tower of Terror
 Tony Powell (Victor Mature), star framed by Aldo Vanucci (aka Federico Fabrizi) – After the Fox
 Emma Prentiss (Jane Seymour), actress romantically involved with Inspector Frederick Abberline (Prentiss was the only fictional character in this otherwise fact-based film) – Jack the Ripper (1988 TV miniseries)
 Sidney Prescott (Neve Campbell) - Scream franchise
 Queen Maeve (Dominique McElligott), aka Maggie Shaw, a veteran member of the Seven. Stars as herself in Dawn of the Seven and Maeve of Easttown, a Vought+ original series - The Boys
 Dan Quigley (James Cagney), actor – Lady Killer
 Thomas Quirk (Dylan Moran), a troubled, struggling actor – The Actors (2003)
 Jessica Rabbit (voiced by Kathleen Turner), toon actress – Who Framed Roger Rabbit
 Roger Rabbit (voiced by Charles Fleischer), toon actor – Who Framed Roger Rabbit
 Stanley Raeburn (Cyril Delevanti), former actor and club member – The House of Fear
 I Lyan Rain, action star from Lady Fighter series of movies – Cinderella Boy
 Kit Ramsey (Eddie Murphy), action superstar – Bowfinger
 Rex Ranall stars as Storm Saxon – V for Vendetta
 Terry Randall (Katharine Hepburn), haughty young debutante and aspiring actress, resident of the theatrical rooming house The Footlights Club – Stage Door
 Alistair Ramson (Gerald Hamer), actor – The Scarlet Claw
 Robin Ray (Alan Mowbray), actor – I Wake Up Screaming
 Reginald Kincaid (Michael Caine), stage actor posing as Sherlock Holmes - Without A Clue
 Larry Renault (John Barrymore), alcoholic actor of stage and screen – Dinner at Eight
 Camilla Rhodes (Melissa George; Laura Elena Harring), unknown actress selected by director Adam Kesher for his film – Mulholland Drive
 Roberta Rhodes (Donna Mills), movie star who was found dead at her home; Dr. Quincy investigated the cause of her death – Quincy, M.E.
 Victor "Gaucho" Ribera (Gilbert Roland), charismatic Latin lover-type movie star – The Bad and the Beautiful
 Jamison Steven Ripley (voice of Rob Paulsen), star of The Round Table Gang, a TV program based on the legends of King Arthur; portrayed Sir Lancelot; he was signing autographs at a Renaissance Faire that Mystery, Inc. was attending – What's New, Scooby-Doo?
 Dash Riprock (Larry Pennell), née Homer Noodleman, 1960s cowboy star dating Elly Mae Clampett, series semi-regular on The Beverly Hillbillies
 Dick Ritchie (Michael Rapaport) struggling actor in True Romance
 Dickie Roberts (David Spade) – Dickie Roberts: Former Child Star
 Huma Rojo (Marisa Paredes), theater actress who played Blanche DuBois in A Streetcar Named Desire – All About My Mother
 Gina Romantica (Britt Ekland), alias of criminal Gina Vanucci – After the Fox
 Terrence "Terry" Rooney (James Cagney), né Thaddeus McGillicuddy, popular New York band leader and hoofer with a radio show, who gets an offer to go to Hollywood to make movies – Something to Sing About
 Marianne Rouck (Greta Garbo), poor French country girl who becomes a great stage star in Paris – The Divine Woman
 Ruth, surname unknown (Mary Stockley), lesbian actress who stars in The Salt Flats, lover of Valerie Page – V for Vendetta
 Jake Ryan (Cody Linley), main character on the syndicated series Zombie High – Hannah Montana
 Hideki Ryuga, a Japanese pop-star and actor whose name is uses as an alias by L - Death Note

S, T, U, V
 Deli Şahin (Cüneyt Arkın), former Turkish action star — Deli Şahin
 Kevin Sandusky (Jay Baruchel), novice actor - Tropic Thunder
 Satine (Nicole Kidman), actress in 1899 in the Moulin Rouge – Moulin Rouge!
 Charles-Haden Savage (Steve Martin), a semi-retired TV actor who was the star of popular 1990s detective drama series Brazzos - Only Murders In The Building
 Chuck Scarett (James Belushi), former martial arts star, now martial arts instructor – Joe Somebody
 Robin Scherbatsky (Cobie Smulders), star of Space Teens, a Canadian children's program; used the stage name Robin Sparkles when she was doing the show – How I Met Your Mother
 Schnarzan (Jimmy Durante), actor – Hollywood Party
 Rose Schwartz (Whoopi Goldberg), writer of soap opera The Sun Also Sets, doing a cameo in one chapter – Soapdish
 Joe Scot (Daniel Craig), Hollywood actor who has to deal with the death of a childhood friend – Flashbacks of a Fool
 Anna Scott (Julia Roberts), star of Helix, Oscar winner for Double Helix – Notting Hill
 Kathy Selden (Debbie Reynolds), voice actress – Singin' in the Rain
 Diane Selwyn (Naomi Watts), young, failed and unhappy actress – Mulholland Dr.
 El Señor de la Noche ("Lord of Night", voiced by Manuel Bellido), a male monster actor working for MKO along with Eva Morte – Hollywood Monsters 2 (video game)
 Severine (Valentina Cortese), actress – La Nuit américaine
 Ann Shankland (Rita Hayworth), who divorced when her husband tried to kill her but, meeting him again in a hotel, finds that they still have feelings for each other – Separate Tables
 Rita Shawn (née Emily Ann Faulkner) (Kim Stanley), Hollywood sex goddess and superstar who is adored by millions of fans, but is miserable in her private life (said to be loosely based on Marilyn Monroe) – The Goddess
 John Sheridan (Charles Laughton), stage actor – Because of Him
 Gil Shepherd (Jeff Daniels), who played Tom Baxter, who in turn jumped off the screen – The Purple Rose of Cairo
 Sally Shine (Lindsay Ridgeway), lost child star whose ghost haunts the Hollywood Tower Hotel- Tower of Terror
 Helen Shivers (Sarah Michelle Gellar) - I Know What You Did Last Summer
 Dean Silo (James Franco), actor featured in Golden Guns, a 1970s-era police drama series – Finishing The Game
 Will Silly (Peter Goodwright), parody of Will Hay and star of the (fictional) 1936 film Oh, Mr. Bankrobber! – Norbert Smith – a Life
 Neville Sinclair (Timothy Dalton), third best paid actor in 1938, Nazi spy, loosely based on Errol Flynn – The Rocketeer
 "Sir" (Albert Finney), Shakespearean actor in The Dresser
 Trevor Slattery (Ben Kingsley), a drunken actor hired to play the terrorist The Mandarin – Iron Man 3
 Sasha Smirnoff (Alexander Asro), waiter and theater actor in Leo Davis' Hail and Farewell – Marx Brothers' Room Service and the play on which it is based
 Sideshow Bob (voiced by Kelsey Grammer), Robert Underdunk Terwilliger Jr., PhD - The Simpsons
 Sir Norbert Smith (Harry Enfield), prominent music-hall and cinema actor of the British film industry – Norbert Smith – a Life
 Iris Smythson (Shirley MacLaine),  actress (probably theater) who played Endora in the 2005 remake of Bewitched, probably also a witch herself – Bewitched
 Soldier Boy (Jensen Ackles), real name Ben, starring in propaganda films dating back to the 1940s, was leader of Payback in the 1980s, starred as himself in Payback, Red Thunder and Payback! - The Boys
 Tugg Speedman (Ben Stiller), action star – Tropic Thunder
 Valerie Stanton (Rosalind Russell), glamorous Broadway comedian with a yen to play Ibsen – The Velvet Touch
 Ben Starr (Harry Shearer), sitcom actor – The Fisher King
 Moe Stein (Richard Herd), plays Captain Galaxy in Time Patrol, a 1950s children's show – Quantum Leap
 Alex Sternbergen (Jane Fonda), alcoholic actress – The Morning After
 Niki Stevens (Kate French), closeted lesbian film actress (based on Lindsay Lohan) – The L Word
 Jenny Stewart (Joan Crawford), tough Broadway musical star who does not take criticism from anyone – Torch Song
 Simon Stiles (D. L. Hughley), cast member of the same-named show-within-the-show – Studio 60 on the Sunset Strip
 Evan Stone (Jim Davidson), kung fu star – Charmed
 Karen Stone (Vivien Leigh 1961; Helen Mirren 2003), aging, mediocre stage actress – The Roman Spring of Mrs. Stone
 Robert Stone (Max Adrian), Shakespearean actor in the Alfred Hitchcock Presents episode, Banquo's Chair
 Stormfront (Aya Cash), real name Klara Risinger, recently made member of the Seven. Acted as herself while filming Dawn of the Seven but by Season 3 the movie had been rewritten, starring Charlize Theron as her - The Boys
 Caroline Suzanne (Rebecca De Mornay), 1980s movie/TV actress, still a diva although really a has-been, she disagrees with his chauffeur's less-than-servile behavior – Identity
 Supersonic (Miles Gaston Villanueva and Luca Oriel), real name Alex, originally Drummer Boy, member of all-Supe boy band Super-Sweet (associated with Vought Music Group), participant on the American Hero reality show (a Vought production) and recently made member of the Seven - The Boys
 Alan Swann (Peter O'Toole), aging, alcoholic, swashbuckling movie star (loosely based on Errol Flynn) terrified of appearing on King Kaiser's live television show – My Favorite Year
 Glorietta Swansong (voice actress unknown), bad actress (an anthropomorphic duck) from silent movies who regularly tries to perform a comeback (inspired by Gloria Swanson's character Norma Desmond) – Duck Tales
 Swatto (Joel Labelle), was a member of Payback in the 1980s, starring as himself in Payback and Payback! - The Boys
 Celeste Talbert (Sally Field), TV actress, vain and aging, acted as Maggie in soap opera The Sun Also Sets, former lover of Jeffrey Anderson – Soapdish
 Lawrence Talbot (Benicio del Toro) - The Wolfman
 Moses Taylor (Rob Corddry), People's Choice actor playing the law-abiding TV cop, Frank Wrench – Arrested Development, episode: "Burning Love"
 Poppy Taylor (Julie Hagerty), theater actress and lover of Lloyd Fellowes – Noises Off...
 Tierney Taylor (Peyton List), papparazzo'ed, successful movie star; hired private investigator Mick St John during pre-production of Lusitania – Moonlight
 Monica Teasdale (Marlene Dietrich), glamorous Hollywood movie star – No Highway in the Sky
 Termite (Brett Geddes), made his acting debut in romantic comedy Pocket Romance (released on Vought+) - The Boys
 Brad Terry (Billy Burke), star of a hit TV crime show; Adrian Monk listed him as the prime suspect in a murder case – Monk
 Pablo Thevenet (Paul Naschy), veteran actor without luck until he meets sponsor Mr. Reficul – Rojo Sangre
 Eddie Thomas (John Cusack), usually paired with Gwen Harrison – America's Sweethearts
 Riggan Thomson (Michael Keaton), a faded actor famous for playing a superhero trying for success on Broadway - Birdman
 Granville Thorndyke (Alan Mowbray), stage actor – My Darling Clementine
 The TNT Twins aka Tommy TNT (Jack Doolan) and Tessa TNT (Kristin Booth), members of Payback in the 1980s, starred as themselves in Payback, Red Thunder, Payback! and Vought Studios produced kids' show "The TNT Smile-Time Hour" in the late 80s and early 90s - The Boys
 Tommy (Tommy Handley) – Time Flies
 Paul Toombs (Vincent Price), horror film and TV actor – Madhouse
 Larry Toms (Dick Foran), Western actor – Boy Meets Girl
 Translucent (Alex Hassell), a member of the Seven, starred in Translucent: Invisible Force and Translucent: Invisible Force 2 - The Boys
 Simon Trent (Adam West), who played the Gray Ghost when Bruce Wayne was a young child, influencing his later career – Batman: The Animated Series
 Barbara Jean Trenton (Ida Lupino), secluded aged film star – "The Sixteen-Millimeter Shrine" episode of The Twilight Zone
 Olga Treskovna (Alida Valli), unknown hired to play Joan of Arc in a biopic, whose death before the film is released leads to a "miracle" – The Miracle of the Bells
 Joey Tribbiani (Matt LeBlanc) – Friends and Joey
 Sam Trump (Peter O'Toole) – North and South: Book Three
 Joseph and Maria Tura (Jack Benny and Carole Lombard), Poland's greatest actor and actress – To Be or Not to Be
 Arthur Tyler (Bob Hope), actor – Fancy Pants
 Basil Underwood (Leslie Howard), egotistical actor, frequent co-star and fiancé of Joyce Arden – It's Love I'm After
 Suzanne Vale (Meryl Streep), movie actress and daughter of Doris Mann – Postcards from the Edge
 George Valentin (Jean Dujardin), actor during the final days of silent films; dislikes the idea of making "talkie" movies – The Artist
 John Van Horn (George Gaynes), veteran TV actor, acted in the same TV series as Dorothy Michaels, tried to seduce her – Tootsie
 Carlotta Vance (Marie Dressler), retired grande dame of the New York stage – Dinner at Eight
 Maria Vargas (Ava Gardner), beautiful Spanish dancer who becomes a great movie star as Maria d'Amata – The Barefoot Contessa
 Deborah Vaughn (Janis Paige), sexy, glamorous, but temperamental musical comedy star – Please Don't Eat the Daisies
 Patrick Vaughn (Lloyd Bochner), TV actor who stars in a community play with Rose, Dorothy and Blanche on the television series The Golden Girls in the episode "The Actor"
 Víctor Ventura (Javier Bardem), unemployed actor working for a phone-sex business – Boca a boca
 Peter Vincent (Roddy McDowall), veteran star of horror films, and the host of a television show called Fright Night – Fright Night and Fright Night Part 2
 Elisabet Vogler (Liv Ullmann), mute(?) stage actress in a hospital – Persona
 Bridget Von Hammersmark (Diane Kruger), German movie star and Allies spy in Inglourious Basterds
 Boris Von Orloff (Tony Jay), typecast because of his mummy role in horror films, after his death and weird resurrection became a TV ad – Eerie, Indiana

W, X, Y, Z
 Patricia "Trish" Walker (Rachael Taylor), a former model and child star known as "Patsy" - Jessica Jones
 Toby Walker (Preston Foster), marksman and former vaudevillian – Annie Oakley
 Mia Wallace (Uma Thurman) mob boss' wife and aspiring actress who appeared in a pilot episode of an unaired pilot titled Fox Force Five in Pulp Fiction
 Wendy Ward (Illeana Douglas), ex-child star turned prostitute who acted on The Elephant Princess – Action
 Charlie Waterman (Robert Warwick), hammy, downtrodden Hollywood actor – In a Lonely Place
 Carl Weathers (Carl Weathers) – Arrested Development
 Tommy Webber (Daryl Mitchell (adult), Corbin Bleu (in the show)), child actor who played the role of Lieutenant Laredo in the fictional television series Galaxy Quest – Galaxy Quest
 Sam Weber (Tom Berenger), studly TV actor, star of J.T. Lancer – The Big Chill
 William Webster/Bronco Billy (Victor Moore) – Star Spangled Rhythm
 Martin Weir (Danny DeVito), Academy Award-winning superstar, acts as main character in superproduction Napoleon and also as a homosexual quadriplegic who climbed Everest – Get Shorty
 Bobby Wheeler (Jeff Conaway), aspiring actor – Taxi
 Grace Wheeler (Janet Leigh), aging former movie star – an episode of Columbo
 Honey Whitlock (Melanie Griffith), future aging star – Cecil B. DeMented
 Tex Williams (Addison Randall), western actor – Another Face
 Wendy Williams (Kaki Hunter), student who acted as Juliet in Shakespeare's play at school – Porky's
 Terence Willis, who starred So Many Men, So Many Minds with Nataria Wong – Noir
 Miranda Wilson (Beverly Garland), a former actress with whom Mysterio was in love – Spider-Man (1994 animated series)
 Rainier Wolfcastle (voice of Harry Shearer), action film star (parody of Arnold Schwarzenegger) – The Simpsons
 Nataria Wong, who co-starred in So Many Men, So Many Minds with Terence Willis – Noir
 Jack Wyatt (Will Ferrell), star of movies like An Onion for Willie (boxer movie) or Atticus Rex (a movie about the Roman Empire with a character in sunglasses), failed with Last Year in Katmandu (a black-and-white movie with unorthodox costume design), and then went to TV acting as Darrin in the 2005 remake of Bewitched – Bewitched
 Timothy Yardvale (Michael Jayston), actor, alias of The Valeyard – Stage Fright (audio)
 Tristan Zale (actor unknown), an alias used by Clayface to become the star of the Gray Ghost movie – Batman: The Animated Series
 Zelda Zanders (Rita Moreno), the "Zip Girl", flapper star of silent movies (said to be based on Clara Bow) – Singin' in the Rain
 Frederick Zoller (Daniel Brühl) Nazi sniper who stars as himself in a Nazi propaganda film by Joseph Goebbels in Inglourious Basterds

Fictional actors in literature
 The actors group asked by Prince Hamlet to perform 'The Murder of Gonzago' before the royal court - William Shakespeare's Hamlet
 Irene Adler - Arthur Conan Doyle's A Scandal in Bohemia
 Armand and the Theatre des Vampires - Anne Rice's Interview With The Vampire
 Beatrice Bauldelaire, unseen character and theatre actress – Lemony Snicket's A Series of Unfortunate Events
 Marguerite Blakeney - Baroness Orczy's The Scarlet Pimpernel
 Bobono, a dwarf who works as a mummer in Izembaro's theater troupe (adaptation, Leigh Gill) - George R.R. Martin's A Song of Ice and Fire
 Nick Bottom (theater character), weaver and actor – William Shakespeare's A Midsummer Night's Dream
 Désirée Candielle - Baroness Orczy's The Elusive Pimpernel
 María de Castro (novel character; played by Ariadna Gil in adaptation), the most respected Spanish actress during the Golden Century – Arturo Pérez-Reverte's Captain Alatriste novel series and movie adaptation (Alatriste)
 Katherine "Kitty" Cobham, a popular actress posing as the Duchess of Wharfedale aboard Le Reve - Mr. Midshipman Hornblower by C. S. Forester
 Elizabeth "Lizzie" Cree - Dan Leno and the Limehouse Golem by Peter Ackroyd, (portrayed by Olivia Cooke and Amelia Crouch in The Limehouse Golem (2016))
 Fernald, "the hook-handed man", villainous theatre actor - Lemony Snicket's A Series of Unfortunate Events
 Francis Flute (theater character), bellows-mender and actor – William Shakespeare's A Midsummer Night's Dream
 Megan Healy, TV and film actress – Double Trouble: All Grown Up
 Izembaro, the lead mummer of a Braavosi theatre troupe (adaptation, Richard E. Grant) - George R.R. Martin's A Song of Ice and Fire
 Lady Stork, a mummer in Izembaro's theater troupe - George R.R. Martin's A Song of Ice and Fire
 Cassandra Limone (born Sandy Leaky) is a recent girlfriend of Channing Manheim's in the world in The Face by Dean Koontz.
 The King and the Duke, con men and actors – Mark Twain's The Adventures of Huckleberry Finn
 Channing Manheim, the most famous and popular actor in the world in The Face by Dean Koontz, is the target of an anarchist's plot
 Dr. Coffin, the Living Dead Man, actually retired actor Del Manning, the Man with 500 Faces - Thrilling Detective (June 1932)
 Elise McKenna (novel character; played by Jane Seymour in adaptation), early 20th-century stage actress – Richard Matheson's Bid Time Return
 Laszlo Nicolavic, an actor specialized in secondary characters, also a swordsmaster and occasional thug; Lucas Corso identified him by comparing him with Rochefort – Arturo Pérez-Reverte's The Club Dumas
 Number Four - Agatha Christie's The Big Four
 Count Olaf, the notorious, chief villain – Lemony Snicket's A Series of Unfortunate Events
 Peter Quince (theater character), carpenter and actor – William Shakespeare's A Midsummer Night's Dream
 Tom Snout (theater character), tinker and actor – William Shakespeare's A Midsummer Night's Dream
 Esmé Squalor, villainous theatre actress – Lemony Snicket's A Series of Unfortunate Events
 Robin Starveling (theater character), tailor and actor – William Shakespeare's A Midsummer Night's Dream
 Tubby Thackeray, comedic actor of the silent-film era The Grin of the Dark, by Ramsey Campbell
 Sibyl Vane, actress who falls in love with Dorian Gray – The Picture of Dorian Gray
 Montana Wildhack (novel character, probably inspired by Bettie Page), pornographic star abducted by the Tralfamadorians to be shown in a zoo – Kurt Vonnegut's Slaughterhouse-Five

Discworld
In the book Moving Pictures, the alchemists of the Discworld have invented moving pictures. Many hopefuls are drawn by the siren call of Holy Wood, home of the fledgling "movie" industry. Some of them begin working in movies, specially under producer Cut-Me-Own-Throat Dibbler. The following list only covers the characters in the book that work in movies, and only if their names are given (failed stars who do not get a single role are not listed). This list is also intended to cover any known theater actor in Discworld, in other books.
 Breccia (troll actor, details unknown)
 Charlie (professional Vetinari lookalike in The Truth, serves as his stand-in during the events of Raising Steam)
 Delores De Syn, real name Theda "Ginger" Withel
 Galena, alias Rock Cliff, troll actor
 Laddie the Wonder Dog
 Blanche Languish, details unknown
 The Librarian
 Victor Maraschino, real name Victor Tugelbend
 Morraine "Morry", troll actor, usually acts as a rock
 Sniddin (gnome actor, details unknown)
 Evil-Minded Son of a Bitch, camel actor
 part of the staff of the Unseen University
 Vitoller's Men (from Wyrd Sisters)
 Bratsley
 Dafe
 Gumridge
 Tomjon
 Olwyn Vitoller, actor-manager
 Wimsloe
 The Lancre Morris Men/Comic Artisans
 Baker
 Obidiah Carpenter
 Bestiality Carter
 Jason Ogg
 Tailor
 Tinker
 Thatcher
 Weaver

Star Wars Expanded Universe 
Although not a main part of the Star Wars expanded universe mainstream, theater and "holo-movies" are also featured in this universe, including the following actors, most of whom reached notoriety only after leaving show business.
 Adalric Cessius Brandl, theater actor, dark side inquisitor and father of Jaalib Brandl
 Jaalib Brandl, former theater actor, Imperial governor later in his life
 Syal Antilles Fel, actress who worked under the stage name "Wynssa Starflare," also the sister of Rebel hero Wedge Antilles
 Nallu Koras, holo-actress, holovid dancer, and galactic celebrity
 Film, actor and con artist
 Garik "The Face" Loran, former child actor of pro-Imperial movies, starfighter ace for the New Republic later in his life
 Roons Sewell, theater actor and later Rebel general
 Shantee Ree, holovid star
 Romeo Treblanc, actor and later entrepreneur
 Epoh Trebor, entertainer, a reference to Bob Hope
 Palleus Chuff, a dwarf actor in Coruscant who had played the role of Yoda, and who later impersonated Yoda in a feint so that Yoda could leave on a secret mission during the Clone Wars. (Yoda: Dark Rendezvous).

Fictional actors in comic books
 Woodsy Alvin, parody of Woody Allen, writing, directing and starring in movies where pretty girls feel oddly attracted towards Alvin's character – Little Annie Fanny
 Valerie Astro, American female star who was hired for Spanish movie Tronak el Kártako as the beautiful and evil sorceress "Tekla de Karb" – Superlópez
 Bernhard "Buddy" Baker, aka the superhero Animal Man (originally A-Man), a film stunt man given the ability to "borrow" animal abilities by aliens - DC Comics (September 14, 1965)
 Barelli, eponymous theatre actor often caught up in dangerous adventures - Tintin
 Bunny Ball - Harvey Comics
 Alison Blaire, aka Dazzler (Marvel Comics) is mainly a singer but also worked as an actress in movies – Dazzler comic series and graphic novel Dazzler: The Movie
 Louis Belski (Marvel Comics), actor who played Dracula – Dracula Lives! # 4 – 1973, & Werewolf By Night # 19 – 1974
 Meggan Braddock (née Puceanu), member of Excalibur - Marvel Comics (December 1983)
 Flygirl (Kim Brand), a actress that the Fly rescued who soon received similar powers from the same source and became his partner in fighting crime - Archie Comics
 Moira Brandon, aging movie star who worked with the West Coast Avengers – Marvel Comics (September, 1993)
 John Caliban, former actor who became an assassin known as Mr. Midnight – The Spirit (July 1940)
 Brut Canlaster (inspired by Burt Lancaster), aged actor, left the old people's home to star as Great Karbalan in Tronak el Kártako, died during the filming – Superlópez
 Kim Carlisle, an actress in a movie starring Nick Walker - The Leading Man
 Strong Guy, Guido Carosella, member of X-Factor, is also a musical comedy actor - Marvel Comics
 Daniel "Dan" Patrick Cassidy, aka Blue Devil, special effects wizard and stuntman transformed by occult energy (adaptation, Ian Ziering) - DC Comics (June 1984)
 The Chameleon, actor turned assassin gunning for Jonah Hex - (DC Comics) (September, 1977)
 Cowboy Wally, real name Wallace Spompenado, actor, producer, entrepreneur and all-around swindler – The Cowboy Wally Show, from Vertigo Comics
 Muffy Cuddle, real name Matilda Hickenlooper, is unioned and was threatened by the Serpent Squad when she was trying to drink with tycoon Tony Stark – Marvel Comics (April 13, 1982)
 Frank Dean, an alien Hollywood actor, married to Leslie Dean and father of superheroine Lucy in the Sky – Marvel Comics (April, 2003)
 Leslie Dean, an alien Hollywood actress, married to Frank Dean and mother of superheroine Lucy in the Sky – Marvel Comics (April, 2003)
 Laura De Mille, aka Madame Rouge, French stage actress turned supervillain (adaptation, Michelle Gomez) - Doom Patrol (March 1964)
 Dominic "Dom" Destine, alias "Hex, the Master of Mysterious", a member of the Destine clan, once a theatrical performer - Marvel Comics UK (August, 1994)
 Richard Destine/Captain Horatio Destiny - DC Comics (December 1999)
 William Destine, a member of the Destine clan, alias actor "William Chance" who plays "Captain Oz" (in Australian slang, "Cap'n Oz") - Marvel Comics UK (September, 1994)
 Bob Diamond, martial artist with mystical powers, member of the Sons of the Tiger, famous as a Hollywood actor – Marvel Comics, Deadly Hands of Kung Fu #1, later Power Man and Iron Fist
 Dixie Dugan, eponymous leading lady of her syndicated comic strip - Dixie Dugan aka Show Girl
 Agnes Eckhart, a witch who played a witch on TV – Vampirella comic series (episode "Haven't I seen you on TV", by Billy Graham)
 Esther, an actress whose kidnapping sets her new acquaintance Wallace on a mission to rescue her - Sin City: Hell and Back
 Doctor Fang, a former boxer and actor emerging in Gotham City's underworld as a numbers racketeer and criminal mastermind - (DC Comics) (March, 1984)
 Little Annie Fanny, starring as a pretty girl strangely attracted to Woodsy Alvin's character, had on-screen sex with him – Little Annie Fanny
 Rita Farr, aka Elasti-Girl, Olympic swimming gold medalist turned Hollywood actress who gained superpowers from unusual volcanic gases (adaptation, April Bowlby) - Doom Patrol (June 1963)
 Alison Frost, actress in a movie starring Nick Walker - The Leading Man
 Miguelito Miguel Gómez (comic book character, name may be a pun on Fernando Fernán Gómez), bodybuilder without real physical strength, was hired to act in Tronak el Kártako as no serious actor would even consider the role – Superlópez
 Mitch Goodman, stunt actor turned TV actor playing the Crimson Cougar on soap opera Tomorrow's Dawn - Astro City (August 2000)
 Basil Karlo, the original Clayface - DC Comics (June 1940)
 Katy Keene, "America's Queen of Pin-Ups and Fashions" is also an actress - Archie Comics
 Lyla Lerrol, a Kryptonian actress who was a friend of Jor-El and Lara's (Superman's birth parents), in the years just prior to Krypton's destruction
 Jonathan Lord, actor who appeared in motion pictures from the 1930s to the 1960s, now retired – Silverblade, a twelve issue maxi-series – DC Comics, 1987.
 Madame Fatal, retired actor Richard Stanton – Quality Comics
 Julie Madison, socialite, actress and romantic interest of Bruce Wayne - (DC Comics) (September 1939)]
 The Make-Up Man, master of disguise, a criminal from Gotham City, who never revealed his true appearance, even to underlings - DC Comics (January, 1965)
 Dino Manelli, Italian-born soldier turned actor, formerly served in Sgt. Fury and his Howling Commandos
 Lindsay McCabe, actress and P. I., a friend of Wolverine and Spider-Woman – Marvel Comics
 Bobby Milestone, former child actor – Silverblade, a twelve issue maxi-series – DC Comics, 1987.
 The Scarlet Seal, former actor Lieutenant Barry Moore - Quality Comics
 Roman Nekoboh (Marvel Comics), flamboyant show biz star with monetary problems and romantic interest to Dazzler – Dazzler comic series and graphic novel Dazzler: The Movie.
 Lia Nelson, aka The Flash, teenage superheroine and actress on Earth-9 - DC Comics (December, 1997)
 Terry None, the daughter of Mister Nobody - Doom Patrol (November, 2016)
 Charlene O'Hara – up-and-coming Hollywood actress who, according to the yellow press, was in a romantic relationship with a superhuman – Marshal Law: Kingdom of the Blind
 Paladin, a superhuman mercenary - Marvel Comics
 Alfred Pennyworth, butler of Bruce Wayne - DC Comics
 Master Pandemonium, Martin Preston, an actor who made a deal with Mephisto - Marvel Comics
 Ransak the Reject, an Eternal-aligned Deviant, trained in martial arts by Kingo Sunen, who found employment for him in Japanese movies – The Eternals comics in Marvel Comics continuity.
 Gregory Reed – the actor who plays Superman in Superman movies of the DC Universe; a parody of George Reeves – various Superman comics
 Byrd Rentals, an anthropomorphic duck and Earth-C counterpart to Burt Reynolds; also known as Rubberduck, a member of the Zoo Crew – Captain Carrot and His Amazing Zoo Crew! (DC Comics)
 Priscilla Rich, the first Cheetah - various Wonder Woman comics (October 1943)
 Fritzi Ritz, eponymous leading lady of the American comic strip which eventually became Nancy
 Arnold Schwarzburger, actor, star of the fictional series of movies Arkon; obvious parody of Arnold Schwarzenegger – Marvel Comics
 Arnold Schwarzheimer, (Marvel Comics) super star, considered for the role of "Man of Kobar" in a possible movie of The Avengers. Parody of actor Arnold Schwarzenegger.
 Paul Sloane, actor/criminal - DC Comics
 Johnny Sorrow, an actor given powers as an agent of the King of Tears - (DC Comics) (December 1999)
 Alice Springs, girlfriend and co-star of William Destine as "Taz, Cap'n Oz's sidekick" - Marvel Comics UK
 Kingo Sunen, star of Japanese cinema, usually plays the role of a Samurai; also an Eternal and a former Samurai during the feudal age of Japan – The Eternals comics in Marvel comics continuity
 Kevin Sydney aka Morph, originally Changeling, a mutant shapeshifter - Marvel Comics
 Queen of Spades (Mona Taylor), washed up Broadway actress and member of the Royal Flush Gang - DC Comics (June, 1982)
 Linda Turner, former stuntwoman and later leading actress, secretly the heroine Black Cat – Harvey Comics
 Tim Turner, silent film actor (retired), father and confidante of Linda Turner – Harvey Comics
 Brian Vane – played The Winged Avenger, a TV superhero (The Vane character was based on actor George Reeves) – Silverblade, a twelve issue maxi-series – DC Comics, 1987
 Marcelino Vinopán (name is a pun on Marcelino Pan y Vino), juvenile delinquent hired to act as "young Tronak" as his appearance was apparently similar to adult Tronak actor – Superlópez
 Nick Walker, successful Hollywood movie actor, is also a superspy - The Leading Man
 Patricia "Patsy" Walker, aka Hellcat - Marvel Comics (Nov. 1944)
 Mary Jane Watson (adaptation, Kirsten Dunst) – Spider-Man
 Film Freak, Burt Weston, a former stuntman and failed actor preferring to impersonate villains - DC Comics (May, 1986)
 Simon Williams, aka the superhero Wonder Man, stunt actor and then played the villain in fiction Arkon IV – Marvel Comics
 Delores Winters, an actress whose body was used by the Ultra-Humanite, eventually becoming a villain in her own right as Endless Winter - DC Comics (January, 1940)
 Zita Zanders, a petty spoiled actress who turns murderous when she doesn't get her way - (DC Comics) (December, 1950)

Fictional actors in video games
 Ashley Brown, from trailer of video game The Movies
 Decoy Octopus, real name unknown, actor turned surgically altered master of disguise infiltrator - Metal Gear Solid
 Kim Dragon, martial arts movie star from the World Heroes video game series; accused of being a fake martial artist by critics, he seeks to prove that his fighting skills are genuine
 Matt Engarde, who played The Nickel Samurai in the show of the same name, and Juan Corrida, who played The Jammin' Ninja in the show of the same name in Phoenix Wright: Ace Attorney − Justice for All
 Jack Howitzer, is an action movie actor in Grand Theft Auto series.
 Fei Long, martial arts actor from the Street Fighter video game series; unsatisfied with film fighting, he competes as a street fighter to hone his skills; a pastiche of Bruce Lee
 Haiku McHuwen, a teen actor in Broken Sword II: The Smoking Mirror who plays "Jimbo Hawkins" in the heavily adapted version of Treasure Island
 Will Powers and Jack Hammer who played The Steel Samurai and The Evil Magistrate in 'The Steel Samurai' in Phoenix Wright: Ace Attorney; Powers also played the lead role in 'The Pink Princess'
 Sharon Spitzer, an actress playing the female lead in the heavily altered version of Treasure Island in the game Broken Sword II: The Smoking Mirror
 Chuck Schwartz, is an actor in Grand Theft Auto III.
 Arnold Steelone, was an actor in Grand Theft Auto III.
 Candy Suxxx (Jenna Jameson) (full name Candice Shand), is a porn actress in Grand Theft Auto: Vice City.
 Zip Toad, a Toad actor from the video game Paper Mario: The Thousand-Year Door

Other fictional actors
 Gary Baldi, played "Jack, the stranger" in Ralph "La Bestia Abominable" Smith's El Asesino Misterioso (The Mysterious Murderer), music by Johann Sebastian Mastropiero; also a pun on Giuseppe Garibaldi – Les Luthiers' Mastropiero que nunca
 Peter Cantropus, actor who plays "old Sinclair" in Ralph "La Bestia Abominable" Smith's El Asesino Misterioso (The Mysterious Murderer), music by Johann Sebastian Mastropiero; also a pun on Pithecanthropus – Les Luthiers' Mastropiero que nunca
 Rose Flowerstink – actress who played "old maid Miss Fortune" in Ralph "La Bestia Abominable" Smith's El Asesino Misterioso (The Mysterious Murderer), music by Johann Sebastian Mastropiero – Les Luthiers' Mastropiero que nunca
 Richard Mace (Geoffrey Matthews), an eccentric 1880s actor and amateur detective in a series of radio plays by Eric Saward (later adapted into the Doctor Who character mentioned above)
 Pretty Nuts – "Charming" actress who played "Molly" in Ralph "La Bestia Abominable" Smith's El Asesino Misterioso (The Mysterious Murderer), music by Johann Sebastian Mastropiero; also an obvious pun on the expression (to be) pretty nuts – Les Luthiers' Mastropiero que nunca
 George Spelvin – the "Alan Smithee" of actors
 Georgette Spelvin – the "Alan Smithee" of actresses
 Georgina Spelvin – the "Alan Smithee" of actresses
 Walter Plinge – the "Alan Smithee" of actors

See also 
 Fiction
 Fictional characters

References 

 
Actors